Ryan McLaughlin (born 30 September 1994) is a Northern Irish footballer who last played as a right back for Morecambe, and the Northern Ireland national football team.

Club career

Liverpool
Liverpool signed 16-year-old Ryan McLaughlin in the summer of 2011 from Glenavon on a three-year deal.

On 9 January 2014, McLaughlin was signed by Football League Championship side Barnsley on a 28-day loan deal and was given squad number 27. He made his club and senior career debut on 18 January against Blackpool in the Championship. On 29 January 2014 it was announced that McLaughlin sustained an injury that will keep him out for four weeks. Two days later his loan was extended until the end of the season.

The only senior appearance McLaughlin made in the 2014–15 season was in an international friendly for Northern Ireland. In August 2015, he was loaned to Scottish Premiership club Aberdeen.

On 10 June 2016, he was released from the club.

Oldham Athletic
On 8 August 2016, McLaughlin signed a one-year deal with League One side Oldham Athletic, with the option of a further year. He was offered a new contract by Oldham at the end of the 2017–18 season, following their relegation.

Blackpool
He joined Blackpool on 17 July 2018 with the clubs agreeing a compensation package.

Rochdale
On 23 January 2019, McLaughlin signed for Rochdale for an undisclosed fee.

On 17 August 2020, McLaughlin returned to Rochdale signing a one-year contract.

Morecambe
On 10 September 2021, McLaughlin joined League One side Morecambe on a one-year deal.

On 1st September 2022, it was announced that McLaughlin had departed the club by mutual consent.

International career
McLaughlin has represented Northern Ireland at Under-16, Under-17 and currently at Under-19 and Under-21 level. He was called up to the Northern Ireland senior squad for a friendly against Finland on 15 August 2012 but was forced to withdraw due to a hip injury.

On 19 May 2014, he was once again called up to the senior squad for two friendly matches in South America. On 31 May 2014, he made his National Team debut as a substitute against Uruguay. McLaughlin became the first Liverpool player to appear for the Irish Football Association selection since Elisha Scott 78 years previously.

May 2018 saw a return to the Northern Ireland team, after he was called up to the cohort for a tour of Central America, featuring games against Panama and Costa Rica.

Personal life
McLaughlin is the younger brother of fellow defender Conor McLaughlin. He is friends with boxer Michael Conlan, and is sometimes nicknamed "Becks".

Statistics

Club

International

References

External links

Profile at irishfa.com

1994 births
Living people
Association footballers from Belfast
Association football defenders
Association footballers from Northern Ireland
Northern Ireland under-21 international footballers
Liverpool F.C. players
Barnsley F.C. players
English Football League players
Glenavon F.C. players
NIFL Premiership players
Northern Ireland international footballers
Aberdeen F.C. players
Oldham Athletic A.F.C. players
Scottish Professional Football League players
Blackpool F.C. players
Rochdale A.F.C. players